Procopius (Ancient Greek: Προκόπιος) (c. 325/326 – 27 May 366 AD) was a Roman usurper against Valens, and a member of the Constantinian dynasty.

Life 
Procopius was a native of Cilicia born in Corycus. On his mother's side, Procopius was a Greek, a maternal cousin, to Emperor Julian, since their maternal grandfather was Julius Julianus. His first wife was probably Artemisia, having married secondly the dowager Empress Faustina, while the Roman general of the 5th century Procopius and his son, the Emperor Anthemius, were among his descendants, the first being the son of his son Procopius.

In 358, during the reign of Constantius II, he was sent with Lucillianus as an envoy to the Sassanid court; in this period he was tribunus and notarius.

Procopius entered Julian's retinue and took part in his campaign against the Sassanids in 363. Together with Sebastianus he was entrusted with controlling the upper Tigris with 30,000 men and, if possible, joining King Arsaces II of Armenia and marching southward, to reach Julian's army in Assyria. However, Julian died and, when Procopius reached the main Roman army near Thilsaphata, between Nisibis and Singara, he met the new emperor, Jovian.

According to Zosimus, Julian had given Procopius an imperial robe, explaining his act only to him. When Jovian was acclaimed Emperor, Procopius gave him the robe, revealed to him Julian's intention, and asked the new Emperor to be allowed to retire to private life; Jovian accepted, and Procopius and his family retired to Caesarea Mazaca.

Ammianus, who based part of his account on the testimony of Strategius, tells that a baseless rumor spread, according to which Julian had ordered Procopius to take the purple in case of his death. Fearing Jovian's wrath, which had caused the death of another army candidate to the throne (Jovianus), Procopius went into hiding, but later supervised the transport of Julian's body to Tarsus and its subsequent burial, and only later went to Caesarea with his family.

After Jovian's death, the new emperors, Valentinian I and Valens, sent some soldiers to arrest Procopius. He surrendered, but asked to meet his family; he had his captors dine and drink, and then seized the opportunity to flee with his family, first to the Black Sea and later to the Tauric Chersonese, where they hid. However, Procopius lived in constant fear of betrayal or exposure among the savage barbarians, and decided to go to Constantinople to ask Strategius for help.

Procopius immediately moved to declare himself Emperor. He bribed two legions which were then resting at Constantinople to support his efforts, and took control of the imperial city. Shortly after this he proclaimed himself Emperor on September 28, 365, and quickly took control of the provinces of Thrace, and later Bithynia.

Though Valens initially despaired of subduing the rebellion, and was inclined to come to terms with the usurper, he quickly rallied, guided by the counsels of Salutius and Arintheus, and the superior ability of his generals prevailed in two battles at Thyatira and Nacolia where Procopius' forces were defeated. He fled the battlefield, and was for a while a fugitive in the wilds of Phrygia, but was soon betrayed to Valens due to the treachery of his two generals Agilonius and Gomoarius (they had been promised they would be "shown favour" by Valens), he was captured. Valens had his rival executed on 27 May 366 by being fastened to two trees bent down with force; when the trees were released, Procopius was ripped apart in the manner of the legendary execution of the bandit Sinis. The "favour" Valens showed to Agilonius and Gomoarius was to have them both sawn asunder.

See also 
 List of Roman usurpers

References

Sources

External links

326 births
366 deaths
4th-century Roman usurpers
Constantinian dynasty
Dismemberments
Executed ancient Roman people
Generals of Julian
Julian's Persian expedition
People executed by the Roman Empire